The following highways are numbered 770:

United States